Lúčina is a village and municipality in Prešov District in the Prešov Region of eastern Slovakia.

History
In historical records the village was first mentioned in 1787.

Geography

Cultural
Lúčina is also the name of the Lúčina Slovak Folklore Ensemble based in Cleveland, Ohio.  They perform authentic Slovak dances from different regions of Slovakia.

References

External links
 
 
https://web.archive.org/web/20070513023228/http://www.statistics.sk/mosmis/eng/run.html
http://www.lucina.org/

Villages and municipalities in Prešov District
Šariš